Mestolobes chrysomolybdoides is a moth of the family Crambidae described by Otto Herman Swezey in 1920. It is endemic to the Hawaiian island of Oahu.

Larvae have been reared from moss taken from a tree.

External links

Crambinae
Moths described in 1920
Endemic moths of Hawaii